Sima Jiong (司馬冏) (before 283 - 27 Jan 303), courtesy name Jingzhi (景治), formally Prince Wumin of Qi (齊武閔王), was an imperial prince of the Jin dynasty of China. He briefly served as Emperor Hui's regent after overthrowing the usurper Sima Lun in May 301. He was the fourth of the eight princes commonly associated with the War of the Eight Princes.

Early career
Sima Jiong was a son of Sima You, Prince Xian of Qi, the younger brother of Jin Dynasty's founder Emperor Wu, making him Emperor Hui's cousin.  Sima You's abilities were so highly regarded by both his father Sima Zhao and the officials that, at times, he was considered as the proper heir, first for Sima Zhao, then for Emperor Wu. After Emperor Wu exiled him from the capital Luoyang in 282, he died in April 283. Sima Jiong, as the oldest son of his wife Consort Jia Bao, inherited his post, and complained to Emperor Wu about doctors' misdiagnosis.  (The doctors, who had thought that they would gain Emperor Wu's favor if they informed him that Prince You was healthy (so that he could indeed go to his principality), had minimized the illness that Prince You was suffering.)

As an imperial prince, Sima Jiong had a sizable number of troops under his command.  When Sima Lun overthrew Emperor Hui's domineering wife Empress Jia Nanfeng in 300 after she murdered Emperor Hui's crown prince Sima Yu, Sima Jiong was a participant of the coup — despite Empress Jia being his half-maternal-aunt, given that his mother had a feud with Empress Jia. But Sima Jiong did not receive great rewards afterwards.  He therefore resented Sima Lun.  Sima Lun, seeing his resentment, tried to appease him by giving him an important military command—of Xuchang (許昌, in modern Xuchang, Henan).

Role in overthrowing Sima Lun

After Sima Lun usurped the throne in February 301, he became concerned about Sima Jiong and also Emperor Hui's brother Sima Ying the Prince of Chengdu and distant cousin Sima Yong the Prince of Hejian, each of whom had strong independent commands.  He sent his close associates to serve as their assistants.  Prince Jiong refused and declared a rebellion to restore Emperor Hui. Prince Ying, Sima Ai the Prince of Changshan (Emperor Hui's brother), and Sima Xin (司馬歆) the Duke of Xinye (the son of a granduncle of Emperor Hui) all declared support for Prince Jiong. Prince Yong initially sent his general Zhang Fang (張方) with intent to support Sima Lun, but then heard that Princes Jiong and Ying had great forces, and so declared for the rebels instead.  Sima Jiong's forces initially were stuck in a stalemate against Sima Lun's. But after Sima Ying's forces scored a major victory against another contingent of Sima Lun's troops, Sima Lun's troops collapsed, and Sima Jiong's and Sima Ying's forces approached Luoyang.  Sima Lun was captured by officials in Luoyang who declared for the rebellion as well, and forced to issue an edict returning the throne to Emperor Hui. He was then forced to commit suicide. Sun and other associates of Sima Lun were executed.

Some thought that a power balance that Emperor Wu had hoped for at his death might be restored, as Princes Jiong and Ying were each given regent titles (and awarded the nine bestowments, in one rare case where the nine bestowments were not signs of an impending usurpation, although Prince Ying declined the bestowments), and many talented officials were promoted into important positions. However, the Princes Jiong and Ying were actually apprehensive of each other's power, and Prince Ying decided to yield the central government regency to Prince Jiong at the time and return to his defense post at Yecheng (鄴城, in modern Handan, Hebei).

As regent
Sima Jiong became arrogant based on his accomplishments. He had his sons created princes, and ran the matters of the central government from his mansion, rarely visiting the emperor or attending the imperial meetings. He enlarged his mansion to be as large as the palace, and he entrusted matters to people who were close to him, and would not change his ways even when some of his more honest associates tried to change his behavior. When Emperor Hui's grandson Sima Shang (司馬尚) died in childhood, leaving Emperor Hui without male descendants by 302, Sima Ying was considered the appropriate successor, but Sima Jiong chose to bypass him by recommending the seven-year-old Sima Qin (司馬覃) the Prince of Qinghe (Emperor Hui's nephew and the son of his brother Sima Xia (司馬遐)) as the crown prince, with intent to easily control the young Crown Prince Qin.

Sima Jiong became suspicious of Sima Yong the Prince of Hejian—because Sima Yong had initially wanted to support Sima Lun, until he saw that Sima Lun's cause was hopeless. Sima Yong knew of Sima Jiong's suspicion, and started a conspiracy; he invited Sima Ai the Prince of Changsha to overthrow Sima Jiong, believing that Sima Ai would fail; his plan was then to, in conjunction with Sima Ying, start a war against Sima Jiong. Once they were victorious, he would depose Emperor Hui and make Sima Ying the emperor, and then serve as Sima Ying's prime minister. In winter 302, Sima Yong declared his rebellion, and Sima Ying soon joined, despite opposition from his strategist Lu Zhi (盧志). Hearing that Sima Ai was part of the conspiracy as well, Sima Jiong made a preemptive strike against Sima Ai, but Sima Ai was prepared and entered the palace to control Emperor Hui. After a street battle, Sima Jiong's forces collapsed, and he was executed.  His sons Sima Chao (司馬超) the Prince of Huailing, Sima Bing (司馬冰) the Prince of Le'an, and Sima Ying (司馬英, note the different character from the Prince of Chengdu) the Prince of Jiyang were stripped of their titles and imprisoned.

After death
In 305, Sima Jiong's accomplishments were remembered, and his sons were released; Sima Chao was created a minor prince.  After Emperor Huai became emperor, he further restored most of Sima Jiong's titles and awarded him a posthumous name. When Emperor Huai was later captured by Han Zhao's emperor Liu Cong, Sima Jiong's sons were captured and executed by Han Zhao forces, and Sima Jiong was left without descendants.

References

 Fang, Xuanling. Book of Jin (Jin Shu).

Year of birth unknown
302 deaths
Jin dynasty (266–420) generals
Jin dynasty (266–420) imperial princes
Jin dynasty (266–420) regents
Executed Jin dynasty (266–420) people
People executed by the Jin dynasty (266–420) by decapitation
4th-century executions